José Alfonso Suárez del Real y Aguilera (born 30 December 1953) is a Mexican journalist and politician affiliated with the Party of the Democratic Revolution. As of 2014 he served as Deputy of the LX Legislature of the Mexican Congress representing the Federal District. Suarez del Real was tapped on July 12th, 2021 to serve as a part of Mayor Claudia Sheinbaum's administrative team.

References

1953 births
Living people
Politicians from Mexico City
Mexican journalists
Male journalists
Party of the Democratic Revolution politicians
21st-century Mexican politicians
Deputies of the LX Legislature of Mexico
Members of the Chamber of Deputies (Mexico) for Mexico City